The Chinese Taipei Handball Association (CTHBA) is the administrative and controlling body for handball and beach handball in Republic of China. CTHBA is a member of the Asian Handball Federation (AHF) and member of the International Handball Federation (IHF) since 1972.

National teams
 Chinese Taipei men's national handball team
 Chinese Taipei men's national junior handball team
 Chinese Taipei women's national handball team
 Chinese Taipei national beach handball team
 Chinese Taipei women's national beach handball team

Competitions hosted
 2009 World Games
 2007 Asian Women's Youth Handball Championship

References

External links
 Official website  
 Chinese Taipei at the IHF website.
 Chinese Taipei at the AHF website.

Sports organizations established in 1972
1972 establishments in Taiwan
Handball governing bodies
Handball in Taiwan
Sports governing bodies in Taiwan
Asian Handball Federation
National members of the International Handball Federation